Takaomyia is a genus of hoverflies from the family Syrphidae, in the order Diptera.

Species
Takaomyia caligicrura Cheng, 2012
Takaomyia flavofasciata Huo, 2017
Takaomyia formosana Shiraki, 1930
Takaomyia johannis Hervé-Bazin, 1914
Takaomyia sexmaculata (Matsumura, 1916)

References

Diptera of Asia
Hoverfly genera
Eristalinae